Janine Allis  (born 1965) is an Australian businesswoman who is the founder of Boost Juice and part-owner of Retail Zoo, which is the parent company of Boost Juice, Salsa's Fresh Mex Grill and Cibo Espresso.

Allis started Boost Juice from her home in 2000. The first Boost Juice store was located in Adelaide, South Australia, and the franchise is now in 13 countries.

Apart from her directorship with Retail Zoo, Allis is also a Director of Michael Hill Jeweller. She is also the author of the book The Accidental Entrepreneur – The Juicy Bits .

Career
Allis started working at the age of 17 as a media assistant at advertising agency McCann-Erickson. She went on to do modelling as well as working as an assistant gym manager. Her early career also included roles such as a nanny in France, a promotions executive in Portugal as well as a camp counsellor in the USA. Allis has also worked as a stewardess on David Bowie's yacht, a senior manager for a Singapore cinema chain, a publicist for United International Pictures, a publisher, an author, and a touring agent for USA comedians.

Allis has been an independent non-executive director at Kogan since April 2021.

Retail Zoo 
After her success in growing her juice business, Allis and her husband decided to diversify their operations by forming a holding company in 2007 called Retail Zoo which they use to acquire and grow other retail food chains.

The first chain that Retail Zoo acquired was the four-outlet Mexican food chain called Salsa's Fresh Mex Grill in 2007. In 2012, Retail Zoo acquired the 20-outlet Cibo Espresso for AU$15 million. In 2014, Retail Zoo started an American-style hamburger diner chain called Betty's Burgers & Concrete Company.

In 2010, the Riverside Company purchased an equity stake in Retail Zoo for an undisclosed amount with Allis remaining in charge. Four years later, Riverside sold their stake to Bain Capital. After the acquisition, Bain owned 70% of the company while Allis owns the rest.

Television appearances 

Allis appeared as a "shark" on the Australian version of the TV show Shark Tank.

In 2019, Allis competed in the sixth season of Australian Survivor. She was eliminated on day 44 and finished in sixth place.

In 2021, Allis appeared as a boardroom advisor for the fifth season of The Celebrity Apprentice Australia.

In 2022, Allis has returned to The Celebrity Apprentice Australia as Lord Sugar's boardroom advisor.

Awards 
 2015 Franchise Hall of Fame Inductee – MYOB FCA Excellence in Franchising Awards
 2015 The Australia Awards for Excellence in Women's Leadership: Victoria.
 2015 InStyle and Audi Women of Style Awards; Business Award
 2012 Australian Export Heroes Award
 2010 Franchise Council of Australia International Franchise Award
 2004 Telstra Australian Business Woman of the Year

Further reading 
 At home with Boost Juice founder Janine Allis

References

External links
 

Living people
Participants in Australian reality television series
1965 births
Australian investors
Australian Survivor contestants
Australian women company founders
Australian company founders
Businesspeople from Melbourne